Herbert Bishop Keller (19 June 1925 in Paterson, New Jersey – 26 January 2008 in Pasadena, California) was an American applied mathematician and numerical analyst. He was professor of applied mathematics, emeritus, at the California Institute of Technology.

Early life and education
Keller graduated from the Georgia Institute of Technology with a bachelor's in electrical engineering in 1945; and from New York University, later known as the Courant Institute, with a Ph.D. in 1954.

Career
A Fellow of the American Academy of Arts and Sciences, Keller was known for his contributions to the field of applied mathematics and numerical analysis including bifurcation theory, computational fluid dynamics (CFD), and scientific computing. He is the co-author, with Eugene Isaacson, of the classic textbook Analysis of Numerical Methods, which is still in use in leading graduate programs in applied mathematics. 
It is interesting to observe that the first letters of each sentence in the Preface spell "Down With Computers And Their Lackeys."
He served as president of the Society for Industrial and Applied Mathematics (1974-1976).

Keller was a recipient of the Theodore von Kármán Prize of the Society for Industrial and Applied Mathematics in 1994. Herbert was the younger brother of applied mathematician Joseph B. Keller.  Joseph Keller was also a co-advisor for Herbert's PhD thesis.

Keller was an avid bicyclist even at 82 years old. He died after his regular Saturday morning bike ride when he took a dip in a hot tub to relax his muscles, lost consciousness due to hyperthermia, and drowned.

References

External links

Herbert B. Keller at the California Institute of Technology

1925 births
2008 deaths
20th-century American mathematicians
21st-century American mathematicians
Jewish American scientists
Georgia Tech alumni
California Institute of Technology faculty
Computational fluid dynamicists
Courant Institute of Mathematical Sciences alumni
New York University faculty
Fellows of the American Academy of Arts and Sciences
Presidents of the Society for Industrial and Applied Mathematics
Scientific computing researchers
20th-century American Jews
21st-century American Jews
Sarah Lawrence College faculty